John Cassin (born 2 July 1951) is a former Australian rules footballer who played for Essendon, North Melbourne and Fitzroy in the VFL, and West Torrens in the SANFL.

He made his league debut in 1971 for Essendon after being recruited by the club under the father-son rule, his father Jack was a dual premiership player with Essendon.

Cassin was mainly a wingman during his career but was also used on the ball and up forward. In 1975 he left the VFL and joined West Torrens in South Australia, captaining them for the 1976 season. In 1977 he joined North Melbourne and was one of the club's leading goalkickers in their premiership year with 36 goals. He managed to play every game that year, including the 1977 VFL Grand Final which went to a replay; as of 2022, he is the only player to have played twenty seven games in a VFL/AFL season. During the 1981 season he crossed to Fitzroy but only appeared 5 times for the club before leaving them the following year.

References

External links

1951 births
Living people
Essendon Football Club players
North Melbourne Football Club players
North Melbourne Football Club Premiership players
Fitzroy Football Club players
Colac Football Club players
Australian rules footballers from Victoria (Australia)
West Torrens Football Club players
One-time VFL/AFL Premiership players